Chyptodes albosuturalis is a species of beetle in the family Cerambycidae. It was described by Ernst Fuchs in 1961. It is known from Guatemala.

References

Lamiini
Beetles described in 1961